HMIS may refer to:

 Homeless Management Information Systems
 Hazardous Materials Identification System
 Hazardous Materials Inventory Sheet
 The HMIS Color Bar rating system.
 Her Majesty's Indian Ship, ships of the former Royal Indian Navy
 Health Management Information System
 Hospital management information system